The 2021–22 season was the 101st season in the existence of Deportivo Alavés and the club's sixth consecutive season in the top flight of Spanish football. In addition to the domestic league, Alavés participated in this season's edition of the Copa del Rey.

Players

First-team squad

Reserve team

Out on loan

Transfers

In

Out

Pre-season and friendlies

Competitions

Overall record

La Liga

League table

Results summary

Results by round

Matches
The league fixtures were announced on 30 June 2021.

Copa del Rey

Statistics

Appearances and goals
Last updated on 23 May 2021.

|-
! colspan=14 style=background:#dcdcdc; text-align:center|Goalkeepers

|-
! colspan=14 style=background:#dcdcdc; text-align:center|Defenders

|-
! colspan=14 style=background:#dcdcdc; text-align:center|Midfielders

|-
! colspan=14 style=background:#dcdcdc; text-align:center|Forwards

|-
! colspan=14 style=background:#dcdcdc; text-align:center| Players who have left the club during the season

|-
|}

Goalscorers

References

Deportivo Alavés seasons
Deportivo Alavés